Furniture of the 1970s refers to the style of furniture popular in the 1970s. Often, the furniture would be laid with bold fabric patterns and colors. Bold designs and prints were also used profusely in other decor. Other design elements found in 1970s furniture and interior decorating included the use of the colors brown, purple, orange, and yellow (sometimes all in the same piece of fabric), shag-pile carpet, textured walls, lacquered furniture, gaudy lampshades, lava lamps, and molded plastic furniture.

Another major aspect of 1970s furniture is the use of teak wood. The use of teak in fashionable furniture and panelling regained popularity in the 1960s and items became chunkier as it progressed into the 1970s. Because of the popularity of wood in homes, dark color palettes also became more widely used as the 1970s progressed. In the mid-to-late 1970s, pine wood began to replace teak wood, and color palettes became even darker.

References

See also

 1970s in fashion

History of furniture
Furniture